Dato' Raja Kamarul Bahrin Shah bin Raja Ahmad (Jawi: راج قمر البحرين شاه بن راج احمد born 14 January 1955) or as known as Hailak Putih (White Hailak) is a Malaysian politician who served as the Deputy Minister of Housing and Local Government in the Pakatan Harapan (PH) administration under former Prime Minister Mahathir Mohamad and Minister Zuraida Kamaruddin from July 2018 to the collapse of the PH administration in February 2020 and Senator from July 2018 to July 2021. He also served as the Member of Parliament (MP) for Kuala Terengganu from May 2013 to May 2018. He is a member and State Chairman of Terengganu of the National Trust Party (AMANAH) and its coalition PH which is in opposition. 

He also served as Chairman of the Hotel Association (MAH) and member of the Badan Warisan Malaysia. He was also one of the leader of Angkatan Amanah Merdeka, a defunct Non-Governmental Organisations (NGOs) led by Tengku Razaleigh Hamzah.

Early life and education  
Raja Kamarul Bahrin was born on 14 January 1955 at Istana Maziah, Kuala Terengganu. After getting an early education at Saint John Institute, he returned to Terengganu and attended Sultan Sulaiman Secondary School (appointed as Head of Student in 1974) before pursuing his tertiary education at the University of Melbourne.

Career as architect
Raja Kamarul Bahrin is an architect who is well known for his traditional Malay-based architecture. He is popularly known as the architect of the Tengku Tengah Zaharah Mosque or better known as the Floating Mosque, the Terengganu State Museum (Museum recognised as the largest museum in Asia), Istana Melawati (Putrajaya) and several others.

Politics
Raja Kamarul Bahrin joined the Pan-Malaysian Islamic Party (PAS) after he agreed to the plea by Abdul Hadi Awang, the party Terengganu state Commissioner. He was picked as the party candidate for the Kuala Terengganu federal seat for the 2013 general election on 9 April 2013 and subsequently won. He was committed to representing the voices of professionals who were ignored by the administration of the BN government and hoped his participation in politics would force the authorities to respect the views and professional society opinions more seriously.

On 21 August 2015, he was declared the chairman of the Terengganu's Gerakan Harapan Baru. On 16 September 2015, he left PAS and joined the National Trust Party (AMANAH) after the party was set up.

Personal life
In 1981, Raja Kamarul Bahrin married Jacqueline Pascarl. She was an Australian young ballet dancer then and later became a writer. They had two children, Shahirah Bahrin and Mohammed Baharuddin. Raja Bahrin later took a second wife under Islamic marital law. They divorced in 1986.   

He then married a Singaporean artist and had four children.

Controversies

Child dispute with ex-wife
In 1986, Raja Kamarul Bahrin divorced Jacqueline Pascarl, an Australian citizen. He signed over custody of their two children, Shahirah Bahrin and Mohammed Baharuddin, an arrangement which was later ratified by the Family Court of Australia. He later tried to seek custody of his children in 1992 through the Australian Family Court.

In 1992, Raja Bahrin came to Melbourne for a pre-arranged custody visit, after which he failed to return the children. After some days of uncertainty of his and the children's whereabouts, Raja Bahrin surfaced with them back in Malaysia. He appeared in an interview on television, but refused to say how he had managed to smuggle them out of the Australia. The events are all recorded and have been recorded with the title 'Raja Bahrin Story' (1997).

In 2006, Shahirah Bahrin and Mohammed Baharuddin were reunited with their mother in Melbourne, after 14 years apart.

Collapse of Sultan Mizan Zainal Abidin Stadium
Raja Kamarul Bahrin is an architect in Malaysia. His company, Senibahri Arkitek, designed the Sultan Mizan Zainal Abidin Stadium in Terengganu, which collapsed twice: first in 2009, then again in 2013.

Election results

Honours
  :
  Knight Commander of the Order of the Crown of Terengganu (DPMT) – Dato' (1994)

References

External links
 
 

1955 births
Living people
People from Terengganu
Royal House of Terengganu
Malaysian people of Malay descent
Malaysian Muslims
Malaysian architects
Members of the Dewan Rakyat
Members of the Dewan Negara
National Trust Party (Malaysia) politicians
Former Malaysian Islamic Party politicians
University of Melbourne alumni
21st-century Malaysian politicians
Knights Commander of the Order of the Crown of Terengganu